Birpara refers to a census town in Alipurduar I CD block in Alipurduar district, West Bengal, India

Birpara may also refer to:
Birpara Tea Garden, a village in Madarihat-Birpara CD block in Alipurduar district, West Bengal, India
Birpara, Kamrup, a village in Kamrup Rural district, Assam, India